Routine may refer to:

Arts, entertainment, and media
"Routine" (SWT), the first of four stories in the second issue of the Star Wars Tales series
Choreographed routine, orchestrated dance involving several performers
Comedy routine, comedic act or part of an act
The Routine (album), by Hotwire, 2003
"The Routine", the first episode of the HBO series Oz
"Routine", a bonus track by Alan Walker from his 2018 album Different World

Computing
 Routine, another name for a computer program
 Coroutine, generalized reentrant computer subroutine having multiple entry points
 Subroutine, a routine inside another routine

Other uses
Ethnomethodology, sociological discipline focused on the methods groups use to create societal order
Routine activity theory, sub-field of criminology
 Routinization of authority, the process through which a charismatic authority becomes a bureaucracy
Schedule, or timetable, a basic time-management tool to formalize or develop a routine
Visual routine, visual cognitive means of extracting information from a scene